Princess Sinaitakala Tukuʻaho (née Sinaitakala Tu'imatamoana 'i Fanakavakilangi Fakafānua; 20 March 1987) is a Tongan royal and wife of the Crown Prince of Tonga, Tupoutoʻa ʻUlukalala, whom she married on 12 July 2012.

Family 
Princess Sinaitakala is the daughter of late Kinikinilau Tūtoatasi, 7th Lord Fakafānua and estate holder of Ma'ufanga, and Princess Sinaitakala 'Ofeina-'e-he-Langi Fakafānua. She has two brothers, current 8th Lord Fakafānua, Fatafehi Kinikinilau Lolomānaʻia and Fakaola mei Langi ʻItafuaʻatonga Tūtoatasi Fakafānua.

Through her mother, she is a member of the Tongan royal family and, of her own right, in line to the country's throne.

Marriage

Controversy 
The marriage caused controversy in Tonga, since Fakafānua and Crown Prince Tupoutoʻa ʻUlukalala are double second cousins. That is, her parents are each the first cousin of the King:
 Fakafanua's father is a son of Kalolaine Ahomeʻe, sister to the Queen Mother Halaevalu, (born Halaevalu Mataʻaho ʻAhomeʻe).
 Her mother, Princess Sinaitakala 'Ofeina, is the daughter of Prince Sione Ngū Manumataongo Uelingatoni Tukuʻaho (known as  The Prince Fatafehi Tuʻipelehake), Prime Minister of Tonga (1965–1991) and a niece to King Tāufaʻāhau Tupou IV.

The wedding was opposed by some members of the royal family, reportedly due to the close genetic relationship of the couple. Most notable in opposition of the wedding was Hon. Frederica Filipe who took to the media and social media to voice opposition of the marriage.

Wedding ceremony 
Sinaitakala Fakafanua married the Crown Prince at the Centenary Church of the Free Wesleyan Church of Tonga in Nuku'alofa on 12 July 2012. The wedding marked the first marriage of a Tongan crown prince in sixty-five years. Sinaitakala was 25 years old at the time of her wedding.

Issue 
Her son, Prince Taufaʻahau Manumataongo, was born on 10 May 2013 and is second in the line of succession to the Tongan throne, after his father. On 12 July 2014, the Crown Princess gave birth to a daughter, Princess Halaevalu Mataʻaho who is third in the line of succession. On 20 March 2018, her 31st birthday, Crown Princess Sinaitakala gave birth to her third child and second daughter, Princess Nanasipauʻu Eliana, at the Auckland City Hospital in New Zealand.
On 25 February 2021, Crown Princess Sinaitakala gave birth to her fourth child and third daughter, Princess Salote Mafile’o Pilolevu, at the Calvary Hospital in Canberra.

Honours 

  Two Sicilian Royal Family: Dame Grand Cross of the Royal Order of Francis I

References

External links
Engagement photos.

1987 births
Living people
Tongan nobles
Tongan royalty
Princesses by marriage
20th-century Tongan people
20th-century Tongan women
21st-century Tongan people
21st-century Tongan women
Tongan princesses